David Chocarro (born April 5, 1980 in Buenos Aires, Argentina) is a former baseball player and Argentine model and actor.

Career 
He entered the Mexican market for telenovelas through the front door as part of the cast of  Los Exitosos Perez. In this story, David played the womanizing "Nacho" where he worked with actors like Verónica Castro, Rogelio Guerra, Jaime Camil and Ludwika Paleta.

Chocarro has also been the face of large-scale multinational advertising, as well as developing as a professional baseball player in his country, something rare in Argentina. In 1998 he joined the subsidiary of the New York Yankees in Venezuela.

Currently, Chocarro is working closely with Telemundo, for which he has worked since 2010 as has been the production of suspense and drama Alguien Te Mira. There he played Benjamin Morandé, a philandering physician, who engages with his wife's sister and, together with a group of colleagues, is pursued by a serial murderer. In this production David had the opportunity to project itself as an international actor with the influence of actors like Danna García, Christian Meier and Karla Monroig.

In 2011, along with Telemundo, he played in La Casa de al Lado, a story about everyday life, as well as the secrets and surprises between two families apparently have a normal life. He played the dual role of Adolfo and Leonardo Acosta. This production features the participation of major actors such as Gabriel Porras, Miguel Varoni, Maritza Rodriguez, Ximena Duque, Catherine Siachoque and Daniel Lugo, among others.

In 2012, he played his first lead role in Telemundo's El Rostro de la Venganza in the role of Martin Mendez. This production features the participation of major actors such as Saúl Lisazo and other stars: Maritza Rodriguez, Elizabeth Gutiérrez, Cynthia Olavarria, Marlene Favela, José Guillermo Cortines, and his La Casa de al Lado co-star Felicia Mercado.

Filmography

Awards and nominations

References

External links
 

1980 births
Living people
Argentine male models
Argentine male television actors
Argentine baseball players
Argentine male telenovela actors
21st-century Argentine male actors
Expatriate baseball players in Venezuela